Mohamed Adel Mohamed Ali Hasan (born 20 September 1996) is a Bahraini footballer who plays as a defender for Al Khaldiya.

Career

Club career

Adel started his career with Bahraini side Manama, helping them win the 2016–17 Bahraini King's Cup, their first major trophy. In 2021, he signed for Al Khaldiya in Bahrain, helping them win the 2021–22 Bahraini King's Cup, their first major trophy.

International career

Adel represented Bahrain at the 2019 WAFF Championship and 24th Arabian Gulf Cup, helping them win both, their first WAFF Championship and Arabian Gulf Cup trophies.

References

External links

 

1996 births
Association football defenders
Bahrain international footballers
Bahraini footballers
Bahraini Premier League players
Living people
Manama Club players